Mitch Korn  (born September 16, 1957 in the Bronx, New York), is a professional hockey goaltending coach and former goaltender.  Korn was hired in July 2018 as the director of goaltending for the New York Islanders of the National Hockey League. Prior to the Islanders, Korn spent 4 seasons as the goaltending coach of the Washington Capitals and 16 years as the goaltending coach for the Nashville Predators under head coach Barry Trotz. In April 2014, the Predators organization decided not to renew Trotz's coaching contract, which set to expire that summer. Korn's contract was also set to expire that summer (June 30), and he chose to continue his professional relationship with Trotz (with whom he had worked since 1998) over renewing his contract with the Nashville Predators. Korn followed Trotz to Washington and replaced goaltending coach Olie Kolzig who stayed on with the Capitals in an unspecified role. Ben Vanderklok replaced Korn as the Predators' goaltending coach.

Playing career
Korn played junior hockey for the Springfield Olympics (MA) and won a National Championship in 1976.  He played college hockey at Kent State University while earning BS and MBA degrees there. [1]

Coaching career
Korn joined Miami University in January, 1981 as assistant coach of the hockey team and ice arena administrator. During this period Korn coached Steve McKichan, who after a brief NHL career eventually became the goaltending coach of the Toronto Maple Leafs.

Korn was hired by the Buffalo Sabres in 1991, where he coached Dominik Hašek to 4 Vezina trophies (league's best goaltender), and 2 Hart trophies (league MVP) over seven seasons.  Korn later joined the Nashville Predators in 1998 as their goaltending coach.

Korn has also coached other NHL goaltenders including Dominik Hašek, Thomas Greiss, Robin Lehner, Pekka Rinne, Grant Fuhr, Martin Biron, Tomas Vokoun,  Chris Mason, Philipp Grubauer, Semyon Varlamov, Vitek Vanecek, Dan Ellis, Ilya Sorokin and Braden Holtby.

References

1957 births
Living people
American men's ice hockey goaltenders
Buffalo Sabres coaches
Ice hockey coaches from New York (state)
Jewish ice hockey players
Nashville Predators coaches
Sportspeople from the Bronx
Toronto Maple Leafs coaches
Washington Capitals coaches
Stanley Cup champions
New York Islanders coaches
Ice hockey players from New York (state)